Gaeloideachas is a national Irish organisation supporting the development of Irish-medium immersion schools at preschool (outside the Gaeltacht) and primary and secondary levels in the Republic of Ireland.

They were established as Gaelscoileanna Teo. in 1973 and kept that name and remit of supporting Gaelscoileanna until 2014 when they were appointed by Foras na Gaeilge to be one of the six lead Foras na Gaeilge-funded Irish language organisations- with a responsibility for the support of Irish-language medium education at preschool (outside the Gaeltacht) and primary and second-levels in the Republic of Ireland.

In 2016 they changed their name to Gaeloideachas.

See also

 Gaeltacht Irish-speaking regions in Ireland.
 List of Irish language media
 Irish language in Northern Ireland
 An Chomhairle um Oideachas Gaeltachta & Gaelscolaíochta
 Comhairle na Gaelscolaíochta

References

Irish-language education
Irish language organisations
Gaelcholáiste
Seanad nominating bodies